Shivadi Assembly constituency is one of the 288 Vidhan Sabha (Assembly) constituencies of Maharashtra state in Western India.

It is one of the five constituencies of the Maharashtra Vidhan Sabha located in the Mumbai City district.

It is a part of the Mumbai South (Lok Sabha constituency) along with five other assembly constituencies, viz Worli, Byculla, Malabar Hill, Mumbadevi and Colaba.

Members of Legislative Assembly

Election results

2019 result

2014 result

2009 result

References

Assembly constituencies of Mumbai
Assembly constituencies of Maharashtra